Mootwingee Station was a cattle station in far Western New South Wales. It is now part of the Mutawintji National Park.

References

Localities in New South Wales
Stations (Australian agriculture)